Bruno César Pereira da Silva (born 3 August 1986), known as Bruno Silva, is a Brazilian footballer who plays for Tombense as a defensive midfielder.

Career
Born in Nova Lima, Bruno started his footballing career at Villa Nova, also playing for Social and MG, before signing for Avaí in December 2007. He spent one year and a half in Santa Catarina state team, set up his transfer on loan to Bahia in 2009. After good performances with the club, Bruno extended his stay until the end of 2010. But in the middle of the year Bruno had issues with the club's football manager, Paulo Angioni, and returned to Avai.

Honours

Club
Avaí
Campeonato Catarinense: 2009, 2012, 2021

Cruzeiro
Campeonato Mineiro: 2018
Copa do Brasil: 2018

Individual
Campeonato Brasileiro Team of the year: 2017

References

External links

1986 births
Living people
Sportspeople from Minas Gerais
Brazilian footballers
Association football midfielders
Villa Nova Atlético Clube players
Uberaba Sport Club players
Valeriodoce Esporte Clube players
Avaí FC players
Esporte Clube Bahia players
Associação Atlética Ponte Preta players
Club Athletico Paranaense players
Associação Chapecoense de Futebol players
Botafogo de Futebol e Regatas players
Cruzeiro Esporte Clube players
Fluminense FC players
Sport Club Internacional players
Tombense Futebol Clube players
Campeonato Brasileiro Série A players
Campeonato Brasileiro Série B players
Campeonato Brasileiro Série C players